Barry Barnes may refer to:

 S. Barry Barnes (born 1943), British professor of sociology
 Barry K. Barnes (1906–1965), British actor